Novopeschanoye is a rural locality (a selo) and the administrative center of Novopeschansky Selsoviet, Burlinsky District, Altai Krai, Russia. The population was 774 as of 2013. It was founded in 1891. There are 9 streets.

Geography 
Novopeschanoye is located near the Burla river 21 km northeast of Burla (the district's administrative centre) by road. Novoalexeyevka is the nearest rural locality.

References 

Rural localities in Burlinsky District